GSPC may refer to:
 Glasgow Solicitors & Property Centre GSPC, a company in Glasgow, Scotland.
 Groupe Salafiste pour la Prédication et le Combat, an Islamist militant organization now called al-Qaeda in the Islamic Maghreb
 Gujarat State Petroleum Corporation
 Global Strategy for Plant Conservation
 a ticker symbol for the S&P 500
 The Garden State Parkway Connector, a short spur of the New York State Thruway that connects to the Garden State Parkway at the New Jersey state line